Quesne is a surname. Notable people with the surname include: 

Charles Thomas Le Quesne (1885–1954), British Liberal Party politician and barrister
Giffard Le Quesne Martel (1889–1958), British Army officer
Martin Le Quesne (1917–2004), British diplomat, ambassador to Mali and Algeria and high commissioner to Nigeria
Ferdinand Le Quesne (1863–1950), British army surgeon and recipient of the Victoria Cross
Julien Quesne (born 1980), French golfer

See also 
Duquesne (disambiguation)
Le Quesne, a commune in northern France
Skylark DuQuesne, a science fiction novel by American writer E. E. Smith